Ian Davies (born 8 October 1964), better known by his stage name Ian Hart, is an English actor. His most notable roles are Rabbit in the Channel Four drama miniseries One Summer (1983), Joe O'Reilly in the biopic Michael Collins (1996), Professor Quirrell in the fantasy film Harry Potter and the Philosopher's Stone (2001), Ludwig van Beethoven in the film Eroica (2003), Kester Gill in the E4 series My Mad Fat Diary (2013–2015), and Father Beocca in the BBC/Netflix series The Last Kingdom (2015–2020).

Early life
Hart was born Ian Davies in the Knotty Ash district of Liverpool on 8 October 1964. He has two siblings and was brought up in a Catholic family. He attended Cardinal Heenan Catholic High School in Liverpool's West Derby suburb and was a member of the city's Everyman Youth Theatre in his earlier years, before studying drama at the now-defunct Mabel Fletcher College of Music and Drama in Liverpool's Wavertree district. From 1988 to 1991, he studied video production at South Mersey College (now part of Liverpool Community College).

Career

Hart was active in theatre through the 1980s, most notably in Pinocchio Boys by Jim Morris, a Paines Plough/Liverpool Playhouse touring production in 1986, and Willy Russell's Stags and Hens at the York Theatre Royal in 1985. He portrayed a POUM militia volunteer in Ken Loach's Spanish Civil War film Land and Freedom (1995) and an unemployed Liverpool shipyard worker in Liam (2000). His best-known role, however, is perhaps that of Professor Quirrell in Harry Potter and the Philosopher's Stone (2001). He also provided the voice of the CGI-generated face of Lord Voldemort.

Hart came to the attention of the film world when he played John Lennon in the low-budget independent film The Hours and Times ((1991). He played Lennon twice more: a slightly younger Lennon during The Beatles' 1960-62 Hamburg period in Backbeat (1994), and a 50-year-old Lennon (having avoided his true fate at age 40) in the Playhouse Presents television production Snodgrass (2013).

Hart played Sir Arthur Conan Doyle in the film Finding Neverland in 2004, having already played Doyle's creation Dr Watson in a BBC One television film of The Hound of the Baskervilles in 2002, and reprising the role in 2004 in Sherlock Holmes and the Case of the Silk Stocking, with a different actor playing Sherlock Holmes. He also played schizophrenic paparazzo Don Konkey in the FX series Dirt in 2007 and 2008. In 2009 he played Tom Ripley in BBC Radio Four's adaptations of all five of Patricia Highsmith's "Ripliad" series.

Hart had an interesting audience interaction during the Duke of York's Theatre's 2009 production of Andrew Bovell's play Speaking in Tongues. After the performance on 23 November, Hart went into the audience and remonstrated with a man whom he had earlier told to "shut up" from the stage. He also played Adolf Hitler in the BBC drama The Man Who Crossed Hitler, which aired in August 2011. He starred in The Last Kingdom on Netflix as Father Beocca between 2015 and 2020, and as Sailing Master Thomas Blanky in the AMC produced series The Terror in 2018.

Filmography

Film

Television

References

External links

1964 births
Living people
English male film actors
Male actors from Liverpool
Volpi Cup for Best Actor winners
English male television actors
English male stage actors
20th-century English male actors
21st-century English male actors
People from Knotty Ash